Bulathsinghalage Sirisena Cooray, JP (25 April 1931 – 30 November 2021) was a Sri Lankan politician.

Biography
He was the Mayor of Colombo from 1979 to 1989 and was elected from Colombo to Parliament in the 9th parliamentary election in 1989. He was appointed Minister of Housing and Construction in the Premadasa cabinet. He had served as General Secretary of the United National Party during the tenure of party leader Ranasinghe Premadasa. He submitted nominations for the Colombo Municipal Council elections in 2006 as the Mayor, however his party nominations list was rejected by the election commission on a technicality. The independent party backed by Sirisena won the election and Uvais Mohamed Imitiyas became Mayor.

His brother Nandasena Cooray was a one time Deputy Mayor of Colombo and was married to the sister of the former JVP leader Somawansa Amarasinghe. Cooray died on 30 November 2021 at Colombo, aged 90 years.

See also
 List of Sri Lankan non-career diplomats

References

1931 births
2021 deaths
Housing ministers of Sri Lanka
Mayors of Colombo
Members of the 9th Parliament of Sri Lanka
Sri Lankan justices of the peace
Sinhalese politicians
United National Party politicians